A crown distillery was one of the state-operated distilleries in Sweden between 1775 and 1824.

Establishment
The network of crown distilleries was established in 1775, when King Gustav III, acting on the advice of his finance minister , declared a state monopoly over the production and sale of alcoholic spirits, with the twofold goal of raising extra revenues for the state while also reducing alcohol consumption and its accompanying health and social problems. It therefore became illegal to obtain spirits by any means other than from the new Crown Distilleries, and as such the importation of spirits from abroad was banned, as was the distillation of spirits by private individuals.

Distilleries
Some 50-60 Crown Distilleries were established across the kingdom, including the following:
 
 
 , Södermalm (Stockholm)
 Strömsbro Crown Distillery, Gävle
 , Södermalm (Stockholm)

Closure
Moreover, the Crown Distilleries themselves failed to turn a profit. However, a few of the more profitable ones remained in operation for some time thereafter, and the last did not close until as late as 1824.

See also
 Gustav III of Sweden
 Systembolaget

References 

Industrial history of Sweden
Alcohol monopolies
18th century in Sweden
Alcohol in Sweden
Distilleries
Alcohol law